Bernard Reginald Streten (14 January 1921 – 10 May 1994 ) was an English international footballer who played as a goalkeeper in the 1940s and 1950s, primarily with Luton Town.

Streten joined Luton from Shrewsbury Town, and made his Luton League debut on 29 January 1947 against Nottingham Forest. He went on to play 276 League matches for the Hatters, with his final league appearance coming on 2 February 1957 versus Tottenham Hotspur.

He was capped on one occasion by the England national football team, on 16 November 1949, in a 9–2 victory over Ireland.

References

External links
England Player Profile at englandfc.com

1921 births
1994 deaths
English footballers
England international footballers
Notts County F.C. players
Shrewsbury Town F.C. players
Luton Town F.C. players
King's Lynn F.C. players
Wisbech Town F.C. players
Cambridge City F.C. players
Association football goalkeepers
People from South Norfolk (district)